East Fife Girls and Women's Football Club are a Scottish women's football team based in the Fife coastal town of Leven. The team, established in 2000, were originally named Kirkland Ladies and changed to East Fife Ladies in 2002. They currently compete in the Scottish Women's Football League First Division (North).

East Fife won the SWFL North in 2016 and were promoted to the SWPL 2. The team finished in 7th place out of 8 teams in the SWPL 2 in 2017 and were relegated back into the SWFL North for the 2018 season. Following the completion of the 21/22 season East wife finished 2nd in the SWFL championship north and won the play off final winning promotion to the SWPL 2 for the season 22/23.

Youth
The club has an ever expanding youth system with teams at Under 8, Under 10, Under 12, Under 14, Under 16's & Under 19's.

All of the clubs youth teams have an emphasis on developing young players as well as encouraging football to be played the way it should be.

Personnel

References

Scottish Women's Football League clubs
Football clubs in Fife
Levenmouth
Women's football clubs in Scotland
2000 establishments in Scotland